Orien J. Harris (born June 3, 1983) is a former American football defensive tackle. He recently played for the Virginia Destroyers of the United Football League. He was drafted by the Pittsburgh Steelers in the fourth round of the 2006 NFL Draft. He played college football at the University of Miami.

Harris was also a member of the Cleveland Browns, Buffalo Bills, New Orleans Saints, St. Louis Rams and Detroit Lions. 

He is the younger brother of NFL offensive tackle Kwame Harris and is married to his college sweetheart, Alexandra Jackson. Alexandra is the daughter of former Atlanta mayor, Maynard Jackson.

Early years
Harris was born to Donovan and Cordel Harris and is the third of four children. He was born in the Bronx, New York, and moved to Delaware in the 4th grade. He was an outstanding student athlete at Newark High School in Delaware, where he won multiple state championships along with older brother Kwame. Harris was rated the nation's top defensive line prospect by The Football News and named a High School All-American by The Football News. As a senior, he was named Delaware's Gatorade Player of the Year, Lineman of the Year and Defensive Player of the Year after recorded 130 tackles (95 solos, 35 assists), 9.5 quarterback sacks and a whopping 70 tackles for losses as a senior. His career totals are: 496 tackles (331 solos, 165 assists), 33 quarterback sacks, 252 tackles for losses. He assisted his team to a 12-0 record as a senior and the 2000 Division I State Championship.

College career
Harris attended the University of Miami and was a letterman in football. He was the first athlete in Delaware history to go on athletic scholarship to Miami. In football, he finished his career with 11 sacks, 159 tackles, and a fumble recovery.  As a senior, in 2005, Harris played in 12 games and 40 tackles (18 solo) with 11 going for losses and 3.5 sacks and a fumble recovery and was honorable mention All-ACC. As a junior Harris started all 12 games at defensive tackle and was voted the team's Defensive Lineman of the Year after making 55 tackles (16 solo), adding 12 tackles for loss, 14 QB pressures and 1.5 sacks. He was also selected First-team All-ACC by Rivals.com. In 2003, he started 10 of 11 games and  recorded 39 tackles (14 solo), eight tackles for loss, four sacks, and 18 quarterback hurries. As a freshman on 2002 he made 36 tackles (14 solos), one sack, one tackle for a loss, 14 quarterback hurries and a fumble recovery. He redshirted in 2001.

Professional career

Pre-draft
5.12 seconds in the 40-yard dash. 355-pound bench press, 25 reps of 225 pounds.

Pittsburgh Steelers
He was drafted by the Pittsburgh Steelers in the fourth round of the 2006 NFL Draft.

St. Louis Rams
On May 6, 2009, Harris was traded from the Bengals to the St. Louis Rams for running back Brian Leonard.

Detroit Lions
On July 22, 2009, Harris was traded from the Rams to the Detroit Lions for wide receiver Ronald Curry. He was waived on September 16.

Cincinnati Bengals
Harris was re-signed by the Cincinnati Bengals on November 24, 2009, after being waived following the signing of Larry Johnson. He was waived again on September 4, 2010.

References

External links
Just Sports Stats
Cincinnati Bengals bio
Miami Hurricanes bio

1983 births
Living people
Players of American football from Delaware
American football defensive tackles
American football defensive ends
Jamaican emigrants to the United States
Jamaican players of American football
Miami Hurricanes football players
Pittsburgh Steelers players
Cleveland Browns players
Buffalo Bills players
New Orleans Saints players
Cincinnati Bengals players
St. Louis Rams players
Detroit Lions players
Virginia Destroyers players